Richard Sylvester may refer to:
Richard H. Sylvester (1859–1930), police chief
Richard H. Sylvester (writer) (1830–1895), journalist of Iowa
Rick Sylvester (born 1942), stuntman